Enrique "Kike" Casanova  (born in Asunción, Paraguay, on 5 August 1980) is a Paraguayan television presenter, announcer and lawyer.

Biography 
Casanova spent ten years in the media. He is a man from the radio frequency that it was becoming an interesting product for the audiovisual industry and television. In 2003 decided to marry  Virginia Faccioli , with whom he had a daughter,  Paula Casanova Faccioli .

He received his bachelor's degree in law in 2005, but from 1998 is linked to the TV being the co-host of "Hot 105" Radio Venus Cable Vision .

He has participated in the animation of events Fashion and Beauty: Miss Paraguay 2001 by Channel 9 SNT; pre selection of Miss Punta del Este on channel 8 of Punta del Este, with Michael Greco Uruguay; Parade and the World Peace in the Conrad of Punta del Este to the agency Dotto Models channel 21 that city.

Career 

In 1997 starts at Radio Venus leading the Hot 105  program. Eventually continue driving several other programs within the radio. TV reaches the hands of Venus, which takes a program on TV, radio sponsored.

It appears driving the TV show American Summer summer and participate in the TV series College girls.

Kike time, it moves through various frequencies as when looking for a music on the car radio. Santa Monica happen radio, Radio Luque 93.3, Radio City, Radio 100 and Radio Canal E40. Currently, he hosts a radio station  Monumental 1080 AM.

In 2003, decides to cut this maelstrom of media work and decides to pause in order to complete their studies law.

In 2005, it received as lawyer and specializes in the criminal part.

A year later started with one of the programs of greatest hits of the Paraguayan television Dancing with the Stars (Paraguay) as Co-driver accompanying the diva Menchi Barriocanal. A month later, Teleshow, head of the program late for most, it was only intended to cover the program Dancing but its success is still being issued today, considered one of the number one gossip programs from Paraguay.

Kike has co-anchored the three successful issues of  Dancing with the Stars  in the Paraguayan version and turn Teleshow, was also as famous  Singing for a Dream 2 Paraguay led to   Dancing with the Stars World.

His workouts songs come from times of intercollegiate, song festivals and karaoke, that's why in 2008 leads another success as  Rush Karaoke  and  Famous  Leaving the nonsense program Teleshow by Melissa Quiñonez. 14 October 2010 the dance competition premiered Dance with me Paraguay, where he led the program. In 2013 it leads for the fourth consecutive year BCPy.

External links 
 Dance Me Paraguay – Official Website.

Paraguayan television people
1980 births
People from Asunción
Living people